The 1998 Grand Prix de Suisse was the 83rd edition of the Züri-Metzgete road cycling one day race. It was held on 23 August 1998 as part of the 1998 UCI Road World Cup. The race took place between the cities of Basel and Zürich was won by Michele Bartoli of Italy.

Result

References 

Züri-Metzgete
Züri-Metzgete
Züri-Metzgete